The 2011 FIBA Asia Under-16 Championship for Women is the qualifying tournament for FIBA Asia at the Under-17 World Championship for Women 2012. The tournament was supposed to be held in Urumqi, China from October 5 to October 12, but was moved to another venue due to unavoidable and unforeseen circumstances. The games were moved to Jinan, China from December 4 to December 11. Japan, notched their maiden title after thrashing Korea in the Championship match.

Participating teams

Preliminary round

Level I

Level II

Qualifying round
Winners are promoted to Level I for the 2013 championships.

Final round

Semifinals

3rd place

Final

Final standing

Awards

References

External links 
 FIBA Asia

2013
2011 in women's basketball
2011–12 in Asian basketball
2011–12 in Chinese basketball
International women's basketball competitions hosted by China
Sport in Jinan
2011 in youth sport